Royalla is a rural locality on the border of New South Wales and the Australian Capital Territory. The area takes its name from the nearby Mount Rob Roy, and was originally a railway settlement on the Bombala railway line known as Rob Roy and changed to the current name in 1905. Modern Royalla is a large rural locality east of the Monaro Highway. The border with the ACT follows the western boundary of the easement of the former railway line to the east of the highway. The town was served by a railway station until 1975.

Australian Capital Territory

The adjoining part of the Australian Capital Territory is also known as Royalla. The part of Royalla within the ACT is included in the area called "Tuggeranong (SA2)" by the ABS, which also includes the ACT part of Williamsdale and all the rural territory between the Murrumbidgee River and the NSW border.

Solar farm

On 3 September 2014, Australia's then-largest solar farm was officially opened there. The event was attended by Simon Corbell, the ACT's Minister for the Environment and Sustainable Development, and Jose Manuel Garcia-Margallo, Spain's Minister of Foreign Affairs and Cooperation. The plant features 83,000 solar arrays, and is rated at 20MWp. It has the capacity to power more than 4,500 ACT homes. The farm was developed by the Spanish company Fotowatio Renewable Ventures (FRV).

References

Southern Tablelands
Queanbeyan–Palerang Regional Council
Localities in New South Wales
Towns in the Australian Capital Territory
Bombala railway line